The Pan Am Junior Badminton Championships is a tournament organized for the 29th time in July 2021 by the Badminton Pan Am (BPA) confederation to crown the best badminton junior players in the Americas.

The tournament is played in a juniors mixed team event for under 19 and a juniors individual event for different age groups simultaneously.  Member countries of Badminton Pan Am can apply in advance as candidates to organize the event. The Pan Am Junior Team Badminton Championship is being played annually for the Charles Nowles Memorial Trophy.

Pan Am Junior Badminton Championships - Individual Gold Medal Winners

Pan Am Junior Badminton Championships - Mixed Team Event Winners

References 

"The first Pan-American Championships", World Badminton, July–August 1977, 11.

External links
Badminton Pan American

Youth badminton